Meet The Searchers is the 1963 debut and most successful album by British rock band The Searchers. The album featured their first single released in June 1963, a version of the Drifters'  "Sweets for My Sweet", which was a UK No.1 for the band, as well as their version of the Clovers "Love Potion No.9", which was released as a single in the U.S. (but not in the UK) the following year.  "Love Potion No.9" peaked on the US charts at No. 3 on 19 December 1964. The album was also released in Canada, Germany and South Africa, often with track listing changes.

Overview
Nationwide interest in the Searchers had been piqued with the success of their UK No. 1 single, and Pye Records, hoping to take advantage of this, promptly decided to follow it up with an album. It was a straightforward performance of their stage repertoire, so they covered a lot of songs by American artists like Ben E. King ("Stand By Me"), Barrett Strong (Money (That's What I Want)), The Crystals ("Da Doo Ron Ron"), The Everly Brothers ("Since You Broke My Heart") and The Isley Brothers ("Twist and Shout). Meet The Searchers mainly consisted of rock and roll or rhythm and blues material with an exception of a modern folk-style song "Where Have All the Flowers Gone?, made famous by The Kingston Trio and Peter, Paul and Mary. The band cut all 11 tracks in a one-day session (aside from the already recorded "Sweets for My Sweet"), just as The Beatles  did with Please Please Me.

Release
Meet The Searchers was released as a monaural (mono) LP album on the Pye label in the UK in the summer of 1963 [Pye NPL 18086]. It entered the LP charts on 10 August 1963, reached the No. 2 spot (The Beatles held the #1 position with Please Please Me) and charted for 44 weeks. Alternatively, two EPs containing songs from the album were released in the UK. Ain't Gonna Kiss Ya, with the lead track originally recorded by The Ribbons, was released in September and reached the top spot on 5 October 1963. The second, Sweets for My Sweet (including Chris Curtis' self-penned B-side song "It's All Been a Dream"), aimed at the lucrative Christmas market in December and went to No. 5.

Track listing

US version (Meet The Searchers / Needles And Pins)

In 1964 the so-called British Invasion started and the Searchers were at the forefront with The Beatles, The Dave Clark Five and Herman's Hermits. The group appeared on The Ed Sullivan Show with "Needles and Pins" and "Ain't That Just Like Me", both of which became hits in the US. Kapp Records got the rights and started to release the Searchers' music. In the American market, albums were typically limited to 12 tracks and it was expected for albums to include the current hit single. Kapp Records released a compilation of the British market albums Meet The Searchers and Sugar and Spice (5 songs from each) with additional songs from the single "Needles and Pins" / "Saturday Night Out". The album, released both in mono [Kapp KL 1363] and stereo [Kapp KS 3363],  entered the Billboard Top 200 on 11 April 1964, went to No. 22 and stayed for 21 weeks.

Track listing

Personnel
The Searchers
 Mike Pender - lead guitar, backing vocals, lead vocals 
 John McNally - rhythm guitar, backing vocals
 Tony Jackson - bass, lead vocals, backing vocals
 Chris Curtis - drums, backing vocals, lead vocals
Additional musicians and production
 Tony Hatch – producer, piano
 Ray Prickett – recording engineer

References

1963 debut albums
Pye Records albums
The Searchers (band) albums
Albums produced by Tony Hatch
British rock-and-roll albums